Radmilo Armenulić (born 1940), is a Serbian former tennis player and tennis coach.

Career
Radmilo was born in Belgrade 1940, and began his career in Partizan Tennis Club. He was a state champion in the junior categories and played in the Galea Cup (under 21 years). After the conflict with selector, Radmilo went to Germany where he had an enviable career as a tennis player and a tennis coach. He spent 12 years in Offenbach. Armenulić was the longest serving federal captain in the history of Yugoslavian and Serbian tennis, and perhaps beyond - 17 years and three months.

Armenulić trained a generation of very talented players: Bruno Orešar, Goran Prpić, Slobodan Živojinović, Goran Ivanišević. Three times they were the champions of the Balkans, three times the third in the world for players under 21 in the Galea Cup, three times in semifinals World Group Davis Cup (1988, 1989, 1991), and six years they were among the top eight in the world.

Personal life
His first wife was singer Silvana Armenulić, with whom he has a daughter Gordana.

References

External links 
 Gloria, Od A do Z

Tennis players from Belgrade
Serbian tennis coaches
Serbian male tennis players
Yugoslav male tennis players
1940 births
Living people